Wachenroth is a municipality in the district of Erlangen-Höchstadt, in Bavaria, Germany.

Geography 
Wachenroth is situated in the valley of the Reiche Ebrach river, a left tributary of the Regnitz river, at the southern end of the Steigerwald, approx. 20 kilometers northwest of Erlangen.

Division of the town 
 Buchfeld 
 Warmersdorf 
 Weingartsgreuth 
 Horbach 
 Reumannswind 
 Volkersdorf 
 Oberalbach 
 Unteralbach 
 Eckartsmühle

History 
 1008 Earliest known documentary mention
 1434 Wachenroth receives the market rights
 1978 Incorporation of Weingartsgreuth with Buchfeld, Horbach and Warmersdorf

Politics 

Since 1 January 2008 Wachenroth is no longer part of the municipal association (Verwaltungsgemeinschaft) Höchstadt an der Aisch.

References

External links 
 Official website 

Erlangen-Höchstadt